Glória do Goitá is a city in Pernambuco, Brazil. It is located in Zona da mata  Pernambucana at 75 km of the state capital Recife.

Geography
 State - Pernambuco
 Region - Zona da mata Pernambucana
 Boundaries - Feira Nova, Paudalho and Lagoa do Itaenga  (N);  Vitória de Santo Antão   (S);  Chã de Alegria  (E); Passira   (W)
 Area - 231.19 km2
 Elevation - 158 m
 Hydrography - Capibaribe River
 Vegetation - Caducifólia forest
 Climate - Hot, tropical, and humid
 Annual average temperature - 24.4 c
 Distance to Recife - 75 km

Economy

The main economic activities in Glória do Goitá are based in industry, commerce and agribusiness, especially plantations of sugarcane, coconuts, manioc, and the raising of cattle, goats, sheep and poultry.

Economic indicators

Economy by sector (2006)

Health indicators

References

Municipalities in Pernambuco